Sri Dharmasthala Manjunatheshwara College of Engineering and Technology (also called SDMCET) is an autonomous private engineering college located in Dharwad in the state of Karnataka, India. It was established in 1979 and is affiliated under Visveswaraiah Technological University (VTU), Belgaum, Karnataka. The institution is approved by All India Coucnil for Technical Education (AICTE).<ref>{{cite web |url=https://www.facilities.aicte-india.org/dashboard/pages/angulardashboard.php#!/approved/|title=List of AICTE approved 'Engineering and Technology'UG'Unaided-PrivateMinority for the state of Karnataka for the academic year :2019-2020|access-date=5 November 2019 |publisher=AICTE}}</ref> The college is located at Dhavalagiri in Dharwad city.

Ranking
 In 2018 it was ranked as the 53rd best engineering college in India by Outlook.
 The Week'' has ranked Shri Dharmasthala Manjunatheshwara College of Engineering and Technology as 67th among the best engineering colleges in India for the year 2019.

Academic programs 
The college offers four-year (eight semesters) undergraduate degree course in engineering leading to Bachelor of Engineering (B.E.) degree in following branches.
 Chemical Engineering
 Civil
 Computer Science and Engineering
 Electrical and Electronics
 Electronics and Communication
 Information Science and Engineering
 Mechanical

The college offers two-year (four semesters) graduate and postgraduate courses in the following specialisations:
 Computer-aided Design of Structures (Civil)
 Computer Science and Engineering (CSE)
 Digital Electronics (Electronics and Communication)
 Engineering Analysis and Design (Mechanical)
 Industrial Automation & Robotics (ME)
 Information Technology (ISE)
 Power System Engineering (E&E)

The college has started an M.B.A. course.

Notable alumni 
 Aravind Bellad, M.L.A. and businessman
 Pravin Godkhindi, Noted Flute Artist
Pankaj Jain, professor of religious studies, film studies, and sustainability
Shirish Kunder , Bollywood personality.

See also
 Sri Dharmasthala Ayurvedic college

References 

Engineering colleges in Dharwad
Affiliates of Visvesvaraya Technological University
1979 establishments in Karnataka
Educational institutions established in 1979